Julian of Norwich (1343 – after 1416), also known as Juliana of Norwich, the Lady Julian, Dame Julian or Mother Julian, was an English mystic and anchoress of the Middle Ages. Her writings, now known as Revelations of Divine Love, are the earliest surviving English language works by a woman, although it is possible that some anonymous works may have had female authors. They are also the only surviving English language works by an anchoress.

Julian lived in the English city of Norwich, an important centre for commerce that also had a vibrant religious life. During her lifetime, the city suffered the devastating effects of the Black Death of 13481350, the Peasants' Revolt (which affected large parts of England in 1381), and the suppression of the Lollards. In 1373, aged 30 and so seriously ill she thought she was on her deathbed, Julian received a series of visions or shewings of the Passion of Christ. She recovered from her illness and wrote two versions of her experiences, the earlier one being completed soon after her recovery—a much longer version, today known as the Long Text, was written many years later.

Julian lived in permanent seclusion as an anchoress in her cell, which was attached to St Julian's Church, Norwich. Four wills are known in which sums were bequeathed to a Norwich anchoress named Julian, and an account by the celebrated mystic Margery Kempe exists which provides evidence of counsel Kempe was given by the anchoress.

Details of Julian's family, education, or of her life before becoming an anchoress are not known; it is unclear whether her actual name was Julian. Preferring to write anonymously, and seeking isolation from the world, she was nevertheless influential in her lifetime. While her writings were carefully preserved, the Reformation prevented their publication in print. The Long Text was first published in 1670 by the Benedictine monk Serenus de Cressy, reissued by George Hargreaves Parker in 1843, and published in a modernised version in 1864. Julian's writings emerged from obscurity in 1901 when a manuscript in the British Museum was transcribed and published with notes by Grace Warrack; many translations have been made since. Julian is today considered to be an important Christian mystic and theologian.

Background 

The English city of Norwich, where Julian probably lived all her life, was second in importance to London during the 13th and 14th centuries, and the centre of the country's primary region for agriculture and trade. During her lifetime the Black Death reached Norwich; the disease may have killed over half the population of the city, and returned in subsequent outbreaks up to 1387. Julian was alive during the Peasants' Revolt of 1381, when the city was overwhelmed by rebel forces led by Geoffrey Litster. Henry le Despenser, the Bishop of Norwich, executed Litster after the peasant army was defeated at the Battle of North Walsham. Despenser zealously opposed the Lollards, who advocated reform of the Church, and some of them were burnt at the stake at Lollards Pit, just outside the city.

Norwich may have been one of the most religious cities in Europe at that time, with its cathedral, friaries, churches and recluses' cells dominating both the landscape and the lives of its citizens. On the eastern side of the city was the cathedral priory (founded in 1096), the Benedictine Hospital of St Paul, the Carmelite friary, St Giles's Hospital, and the Greyfriars monastery. To the south, the priory at Carrow was located just beyond the city walls. Its income was mainly generated from "livings" acquired from the renting of its assets, which included the Norwich churches of St Julian, All Saints Timberhill, St Edward Conisford and St Catherine Newgate, all now lost apart from St Julian's. The churches with anchorite cells enhanced the reputation of the priory, as they attracted endowments from across society.

Life

Sources for Julian's life 
Little of Julian's life is known. She provided a few scant comments about herself in her own writings, later published in a book commonly known as Revelations of Divine Love, a title first used in 1670. The earliest surviving copy of a manuscript of Julian's, made by a scribe in the 1470s, acknowledges her as the author of the work.

The earliest known references to Julian come from four wills, in which she is described as being an anchoress. The wills were all made by individuals who lived in Norfolk. Roger Reed, the rector of St Michael Coslany, Norwich, whose will of 20March 1394 provides the earliest record of Julian's existence, made a bequest of 12shillings to be paid to "Julian anakorite". Thomas Edmund, a Chantry priest from Aylsham, stipulated in his will of 19May 1404 that 12pennies be given to "Julian, anchoress of the church of St Julian, Conisford" and 8 pennies to "Sarah, living with her". John Plumpton from Norwich gave 40 pennies to "the anchoress in the church of St Julian's, Conisford, and a shilling each to her maid and her former maid Alice" in his will dated 24November 1415. The fourth person to mention Julian was Isabelle, Countess of Suffolk (the second wife of William de Ufford, 2nd Earl of Suffolk), who made a bequest of 20shillings to "" in her will dated 26 September 1416. As a bequest to an unnamed anchorite at St Julian's was made in 1429, there is a possibility Julian was alive at this time.

Julian was known as a spiritual authority within her community, where she also served as an adviser. In around 1414, when she was in her seventies, she was visited by the English mystic Margery Kempe. The Book of Margery Kempe, which is possibly the first autobiography to be written in English, mentions that Kempe travelled to Norwich to obtain spiritual advice from Julian, saying she was "bidden by Our Lord" to go to "Dame Jelyan ... for the anchoress was expert in" divine revelations, "and good counsel could give". Kempe never referred to Julian as an author, although she was familiar with the works of other spiritual writers, and mentioned them.

Visions
Julian wrote in Revelations of Divine Love that she became seriously ill at the age of 30. She could have been an anchoress when she fell ill, although it is possible she was a lay person living at home, as she was visited by her mother and other people, and the rules of enclosure for an anchoress would not normally have allowed outsiders such access. On 8May 1373 a curate administered the last rites of the Church to her, in anticipation of her death. As he held a crucifix above the foot of her bed, she began to lose her sight and feel physically numb, but gazing on the crucifix she saw the figure of Jesus begin to bleed. Over the next several hours, she had a series of 15 visions of Jesus, and a 16th the following night.

Julian completely recovered from her illness on 13May; there is general agreement that she wrote about her shewings shortly after she experienced them. Her original manuscript no longer exists, but a copy, now known as the Short Text,  survived. Decades later, perhaps in the early 1390s, she began a theological exploration of the meaning of her visions, and produced writings now known as The Long Text. This second work seems to have gone through many revisions before it was finished, perhaps in the 1410s or 1420s. Julian's revelations seem to be the first important example of a vision by an Englishwoman for 200 years, in contrast with the Continent, where "a golden age of women's mysticism" occurred during the 13th and 14th centuries.

Personal life

The few autobiographical details Julian included in the Short Text, including her gender, were suppressed when she wrote her longer text later in life. Historians are not even sure of her actual name. It is generally thought to be taken from the church in Norwich to which her cell was attached, but Julian was also used in its own right as a girl's name in the Middle Ages, and so could have been her Christian name.

Julian's writings indicate that she was born in 1343 or late 1342, and died after 1416. She was six when the Black Death arrived in Norwich. It has been speculated that she was educated as a young girl by the Benedictine nuns of Carrow Abbey, as a school for girls existed there during her childhood. There is no written evidence that she was ever a nun at Carrow.

According to several commentators, including Santha Bhattacharji in the Oxford Dictionary of National Biography, Julian's discussion of the maternal nature of God suggests that she knew of motherhood from her own experience of bringing up children. As plague epidemics were rampant during the 14th century, it has been suggested that Julian may have lost her own family as a result. By becoming an anchoress she would have been kept in quarantine away from the rest of the population of Norwich. However, nothing in Julian's writings provides any indication of the plagues, religious conflict, or civil insurrection that occurred in the city during her lifetime. Kenneth Leech and Sister Benedicta Ward, the joint authors of Julian Reconsidered (1988), concluded that she was a young widowed mother and never a nun. They based their opinion on a dearth of references about her occupation in life and a lack of evidence to connect her with Carrow Abbey, which would have honoured her and buried her in the grounds had she been strongly connected with the priory.

Life as an anchoress

Julian was an anchoress from at least the 1390s. Living in her cell, she would have played an important part within her community, devoting herself to a life of prayer to complement the clergy in their primary function as protectors of souls. Her solitary life would have begun after the completion of an onerous selection process. An important church ceremony would have taken place at St Julian's Church, in the presence of the bishop. During the ceremony, psalms from the Office of the Dead would have been sung for Julian (as if it were her funeral), and at some point she would have been led to her cell door and into the room beyond. The door would afterwards have been sealed up, and she would have remained in her cell for the rest of her life.

Once her life of seclusion had begun, Julian would have had to follow the strict rules laid down for anchoresses. Two important sources of information about the life of such women have survived. De institutione inclusarum was written in Latin by Ælred of Rieveaulx in around 1162, and the Ancrene Riwle was written in Middle English in around 1200. Originally made for three sisters, the Ancrene Riwle became in time a manual for all female recluses. The work regained its former popularity during the mystical movement of the 14th century. It may have been available to Julian to read and become familiar with—being a book written in a language she could read. The book stipulated that anchoresses should live in confined isolation, in poverty, and under a vow of chastity. The popular image of Julian living with her cat for company stems from the regulations set out in the Ancrene Riwle.

As an anchoress living in the heart of an urban environment, Julian would not have been entirely secluded. She would have enjoyed the financial support of the more prosperous members of the local community, as well as the general affection of the population. She would have in turn provided prayers and given advice to visitors, serving as an example of devout holiness. According to one edition of the Cambridge Medieval History, it is possible that she met the English mystic Walter Hilton, who died when Julian was in her fifties, and who may have influenced her writings in a small way.

Revelations of Divine Love 

Both the Long Text and Short Text of Julian's Revelations of Divine Love contain an account of each of her revelations. Her writings are unique, as they are the earliest surviving English language works by a woman, although it is possible that some anonymous works may have had female authors. They are also the only surviving writings by an English anchoress. The Long Text consists of 86 chapters and about 63,500 words, and is about six times longer than the Short Text.

In 14th century England, when women were generally barred from high status positions, their knowledge of Latin would have been limited, and it is more likely that they read and wrote in English. The historian Janina Ramirez has suggested that by choosing to write in her vernacular language, a precedent set by other medieval writers, Julian was "attempting to express the inexpressible" in the best way possible. Nothing written by Julian was ever mentioned in any bequests, nor written for a specific readership, or influenced other medieval authors, and almost no references were made to her writings from the time they were written until the beginning of the 20th century.

Julian's writings were largely unknown until 1670, when they were published under the title XVI Revelations of Divine Love, shewed to a devout servant of Our Lord, called Mother Juliana, an Anchorete of Norwich: Who lived in the Dayes of King Edward the Third by Serenus de Cressy, a confessor for the English nuns at Cambrai. Cressy based his book on the Long Text, probably written by Julian in the 1410s or 1420s. Three manuscript copies of the Long Text have survived. One copy of the complete Long Text, known as the Paris Manuscript, resides in the Bibliothèque nationale de France in Paris, and two other manuscripts are now in the British Library in London. One of the manuscripts was perhaps copied out by Dame Clementina Cary, who founded the English Benedictine monastery in Paris. Cressy's edition was reprinted in 1843 and 1864, and again in 1902.

A new version of the book was produced by Henry Collins in 1877. It became still better known after the publication of Grace Warrack's 1901 edition, which included modernised language, as well as, according to the author Georgia Ronan Crampton, a "sympathetic informed introduction". The book introduced most early 20th century readers to Julian's writings; according to the historian Henrietta Leyser, Julian was "beloved in the 20th century by theologians and poets alike".

Julian's shorter work, now known as the Short Text, was probably written not long after her visions in May 1373. As with the Long Text, the original manuscript was lost, but not before at least one copy was made by a scribe. It was in the possession of an English Catholic family at one point. The copy was seen and described by the antiquarian Francis Blomefield in 1745. After disappearing from view for 150 years, it was found in 1910, in a collection of contemplative medieval texts bought by the British Museum, and was published by the Reverend Dundas Harford in 1911. Now part of British Library Add MS 37790, the manuscript—with Julian's Short Text of 33 pages (folios 97r to 115r)—is held in the British Library.

Theology 

Julian of Norwich is now recognised as one of England's most important mystics; according to Leyser, she was the greatest English anchoress. For the theologian Denys Turner the core issue Julian addresses in Revelations of Divine Love is "the problem of sin". Julian says that sin is behovely, which is often translated as "necessary", "appropriate", or "fitting".

Julian lived in a time of turmoil, but her theology was optimistic and spoke of God's omnibenevolence and love in terms of joy and compassion. Revelations of Divine Love "contains a message of optimism based on the certainty of being loved by God and of being protected by his Providence".

A characteristic element of Julian's mystical theology was her equating divine love with motherly love, a theme found in the Biblical prophets, as in Isaiah 49:15. According to Julian, God is both our mother and our father. As the medievalist Caroline Walker Bynum shows, this idea was also developed by Bernard of Clairvaux and others from the 12thcentury onward. Bynum regards the medieval notion of Jesus as a mother as being a metaphor rather than a literal belief. In her fourteenth revelation, Julian writes of the Trinity in domestic terms, comparing Jesus to a mother who is wise, loving and merciful. Author Frances Beer asserted that Julian believed that the maternal aspect of Christ was literal and not metaphoric: Christ is not like a mother, he is literally the mother. Julian emphasised this by explaining how the bond between mother and child is the only earthly relationship that comes close to the relationship a person can have with Jesus. She used metaphors when writing about Jesus in relation to ideas about conceiving, giving birth, weaning and upbringing.

Julian wrote, "For I saw no wrath except on man's side, and He forgives that in us, for wrath is nothing else but a perversity and an opposition to peace and to love." She wrote that God sees us as perfect and waits for the day when human souls mature so that evil and sin will no longer hinder us, and that "God is nearer to us than our own soul". This theme is repeated throughout her work: "Jesus answered with these words, saying: 'All shall be well, and all shall be well, and all manner of thing shall be well.' ... This was said so tenderly, without blame of any kind toward me or anybody else."

Her status as an anchoress may have prevented contemporary monastic and university authorities from challenging her theology. A lack of references to her work during her own time may indicate that she kept her writings with her in her cell, so that religious authorities were unaware of them. The 14th-century English cardinal Adam Easton's Defensorium sanctae birgittae, Alfonso of Jaen's Epistola Solitarii, and the English mystic William Flete's Remedies against Temptations, are all referenced in Julian's text.

Commemoration 

Julian is remembered in the Church of England with a Lesser Festival on 8 May. The Episcopal Church and the Evangelical Lutheran Church in the United States also commemorate her on 8 May.

Although not canonised in the Catholic Church or listed in the Roman Martyrology, Julian is said to have a feast day on 13 May, and she is quoted in the Catechism of the Catholic Church. In 1997, Father Giandomenico Mucci listed Julian among eighteen saints and blesseds who are considered potential Doctors of the Church, describing her as a beata.

Pope Benedict XVI discussed the life and teaching of Julian at a General Audience on 1 December 2010, without describing her as either a saint or a blessed as he regularly did when discussing such persons in the same series of audiences. He stated: "Julian of Norwich understood the central message for spiritual life: God is love and it is only if one opens oneself to this love, totally and with total trust, and lets it become one's sole guide in life, that all things are transfigured, true peace and true joy found and one is able to radiate it." He concluded: "'And all will be well,' 'all manner of things shall be well': this is the final message that Julian of Norwich transmits to us and that I am also proposing to you today."

Legacy
The 20th- and 21st-century revival of interest in Julian has been associated with a renewed interest in Christian contemplation in the English-speaking world. The Julian Meetings, an association of contemplative prayer groups, takes its name from her, but is unaffiliated to any faith doctrine, and is unconnected with Julian's theology, although her writings are sometimes used in meetings.

St Julian's Church
There were no hermits or anchorites in Norwich from 1312 until the emergence of Julian in the 1370s. St Julian's Church, located off King Street in the south of Norwich city centre, holds regular services. The building, which has a round tower, is one of the 31 parish churches from a total of 58 that once existed in Norwich during the Middle Ages, of which 36 had an anchorite cell.

The cell did not remain empty after Julian's death. In 1428 Julian(a) Lampett (or Lampit) moved in when Edith Wilton was the prioress responsible for the church, and remained in the cell until 1478 when Margaret Pygot was prioress. The cell continued to be used by anchorites until the dissolution of the monasteries in the 1530s, when it was demolished and the church stripped of its rood screen and statues. No rector was appointed from then until 1581.

By 1845 St Julian's was in a poor state of repair and the east wall collapsed that year. After an appeal for funds, the church was restored. The church underwent further restoration during the first half of the 20th century, but was destroyed during the Norwich Blitz of June 1942 when the tower received a direct hit. After the war, the church was rebuilt. It now appears largely as it was before its destruction, although its tower is much reduced in height and a chapel has been built in place of the long-lost anchorite cell.

Literature
The Catechism of the Catholic Church quotes from Revelations of Divine Love in its explanation of how God can draw a greater good, even from evil. The poet T. S. Eliot incorporated "All shall be well, and all shall be well, and all manner of thing shall be well" three times into his poem "Little Gidding", the fourth of his Four Quartets (1943), as well as Julian's "the ground of our beseeching". The poem renewed the English-speaking public's awareness of Julian's texts.

Sydney Carter's song "All Shall Be Well" (sometimes called "The Bells of Norwich"), which uses words by Julian, was published in 1982. Julian's writings have been translated into numerous languages.

Norfolk and Norwich
In 2013 the University of East Anglia honoured Julian by naming its new study centre the Julian Study Centre. Norwich's first Julian Week was held in May 2013. The celebration included concerts, talks, and free events held throughout the city, with the stated aim of encouraging people "to learn about Julian and her artistic, historical and theological significance".

The Lady Julian Bridge, crossing the River Wensum and linking King Street and the Riverside Walk close to Norwich railway station, was named in honour of the anchoress. An example of a swing bridge, built to allow larger vessels to approach a basin further upstream, it was designed by the Mott MacDonald Group and completed in 2009.

Self-isolation during the COVID-19 pandemic
In March 2020, during the height of the COVID-19 pandemic, the experiences of Julian and other anchorites were cited in advice for people around the world newly discovering self-isolation. Ramirez was quoted by BBC News, saying that "Julian was living in the wake of the Black Death, and around her repeated plagues were re-decimating an already depleted population. I think she was self-isolating. The other anchorites would have understood that by removing themselves from life this would not only give them a chance of preserving their own life but also of finding calm and quiet and focus in a chaotic world."

Works: Revelations of Divine Love

Manuscripts

Long Text
 
 
 
 Westminster Cathedral Treasury MS 4 (W), a late 15th or early 16th century manuscript. It includes extracts from Julian's Long Text, as well as selections from the writings of the English mystic Walter Hilton. The manuscript is on loan to Westminster Abbey's Muniments Room and Library.

Short Text

Selected editions
 
 
  (The second edition (1907) is available online from the Internet Archive.)

See also
 Order of Julian of Norwich
 Visions of Jesus and Mary

Notes

References

Sources

Further reading

External links

 The Friends of Julian of Norwich website
 Julian of Norwich: her Showing of Love and its Context produced by the Umilta website.
 "Julian of Norwich" from the Luminarium Encyclopedia.
 Heart and Soul: The Path of Love – Julian of Norwich from BBC Sounds, a short radio programme about Julian and her writings. (registration required, may not be available outside the UK)
 
 

1340s births
Year of birth uncertain
15th-century deaths
Year of death unknown
Writers from Norwich
14th-century Christian mystics
14th-century English women writers
15th-century English women writers
15th-century English writers
Women religious writers
English Roman Catholic writers
English Catholic mystics
Catholic spirituality
English religious writers
Middle English literature
Women mystics
English theologians
Medieval English theologians